Capitol Commons is a mixed-use development in Oranbo, Pasig, Metro Manila, Philippines. It is a redevelopment of the former Rizal Provincial Capitol complex located in the village of Oranbo adjacent to the Ortigas Center financial district. The  site being developed by Ortigas & Company Limited Partnership, the same developer behind Ortigas Center, features Pasig's first high-end shopping center called Estancia at Capitol Commons. The development is also home to the Capitol Commons Park, which takes up fifty percent of the development.

Location
Capitol Commons is situated in the southern portion of the barangay of Oranbo in the western part of Pasig just north of the village of Kapitolyo (named after the former provincial capitol). It is an eastern extension of Ortigas Center bounded by Meralco Avenue on the west, Shaw Boulevard on the south, Camino Verde Road to the east, and Capt. Henry Javier Street to the north. It is located close to major Pasig landmarks such as the PhilSports Complex, the Department of Education main offices, Valle Verde Country Club, and the University of Asia and the Pacific.

History

The Capitol Commons site formed part of the Hacienda de Mandaloyon which Ortigas & Co. founder Don Francisco Ortigas y Barcinas purchased from the Augustinian religious order during the early days of the American colonial period. The estate spanned  covering parts of Pasig, Mandaluyong, Quezon City and San Juan in what was then the province of Rizal. Over the years, Ortigas & Co. developed and sold off most of the former estate as subdivisions or villages such as Valle Verde, Greenhills, Wack-Wack and Greenmeadows. In 1950, the provincial capitol was moved from its former location on the Mariquina River in Pasig to this new site donated by Ortigas & Co. The Rizal capitol stood on this site for close to 60 years even after Pasig was separated from the province and annexed to Metropolitan Manila since November 7, 1975. In 2008, the Rizal provincial government finally moved its capital to Antipolo with its new capitol located near the Ynares Center. Ownership of the old capitol site was then transferred back to the Ortigas company for redevelopment as a commercial center in 2011.

Estancia Mall and Office Complex

Estancia is the upscale retail anchor for the Capitol Commons development. It has  of leasable space in three levels and is anchored by international furniture retailers West Elm and Pottery Barn. The lifestyle center also carries other international brands such as Aéropostale, Old Navy, Cortefiel, Debenhams, Kurt Geiger, Diesel and Isaac Mizrahi. It is also home to several restaurant chains such as Coco Ichiban and TWG Tea. A major component of the Estancia mixed-use complex is the North and South Wings which house  of business process outsourcing (BPO) office space accredited by the Philippine Economic Zone Authority (PEZA). The mall was completed in 2014.

Estancia Mall Expansion

Ortigas & Company have allotted  in key developments within the Capitol Commons property. This includes a large expansion to Estancia Mall, initially called The Paragon and Entertainment Hub in previous marketing materials, called the East Wing. Estancia Mall's expanded section will have a gross floor area of  It will house a branch of The SM Store, 6 cinemas, more lifestyle shops, and office spaces at the top floors.

The mall's new section opened on November 29, 2019, and it hosts the first-ever Ortigas Cinemas with four digital cinemas and two luxurious Screening Room Cinemas. It is also co-managed by SM Cinema.

Other projects

Residential Condominiums
 The Imperium
 The Royalton
 Maven
 The Empress

Retail
 Unimart Supermarket
 Gastro
 Paragon Mall

Leisure
 Capitol Commons Park

References

Mixed-use developments in Metro Manila
Buildings and structures in Pasig
Planned communities in the Philippines